Annayya (Kannada: ಅಣ್ಣಯ್ಯ) is a 1993 Indian Kannada-language drama film directed by D. Rajendra Babu based on K. Bhagyaraj's 1987 film Enga Chinna Rasa, whose story was inspired by the Kannada novel Ardhaangi, by B. Puttaswamayya. The film features V. Ravichandran playing the title character along with Madhoo, Aruna Irani, Dheerendra Gopal and Srinath in other prominent roles. The music was composed by Hamsalekha. The film was produced by M. Chandrashekar. The film revolves around a battle of wits b/w a mother-in-law and a wife.

Plot
Annayya is a story of a person named "Annayya" (Ravichandran), who is the only child of a rich Landlord (Srinath) and had lost his mother at the time of his birth. Annayya's father can provide him anything he wants, but Annayys's only desire is to get a mother's love. In order to fulfill his son's desire, Sreenath marries Nagamani (Aruna Irani), thinking that she could take care of him more than his real mother would. As the day passes, Nagamani's brother Dheerendra Gopal enters into Annayya's house by convincing Sreenath that he has lost all his properties due to some loss. Then Dheerendra Gopal asks her sister Nagamani to get the property of Annayya's to be  transferred into her name so as to think of her child, which is about to be born. Then Nagamani makes Annayya to follow each and every step that her mother says and not to take even a single decision without her permission. He even stops going to school and becomes a slave to his mother.

As the time passes, Annayya grows up and marries Saraswati (Madhoo). Saraswati discovers that Nagamani's motherly love is fake and all that Nagamani wants is to capture Annayya's wealth. Then the battle begins within the household between daughter-in-law and mother-in-law which involves Saraswati trying to outdo Nagamani. This involves Saraswati voicing her concerns to Annayya about his mother, resulting in Saraswati being slapped once by her husband, and alienating him. This humiliation does not worry Saraswati, who eventually wins the battle once Nagamani realizes the importance of loving her stepson back as much as he loves her.

Cast

 Ravichandran as Annayya
 Madhoo as Saraswati
 Aruna Irani as Nagamani, Annayya's step-mother
 Srinath as Manjunathayya, Annayya's father
 Dheerendra Gopal as Nagamani's brother
 Sanketh Kashi as Kariya
 Indudhar as Dheerendra Gopal's son
 Ashalatha
 Latha 
 Shanthamma 
 Bank Suresh
 M.S. Karanth 
 Rajanand 
 Lakshman Rao

Soundtrack

The music composed by Hamsalekha was well received and the audio sales hit a record high.

Remakes
The story line has been inspiration for various movies and has had various remakes in Indian film industry.

References

External links

1990s Kannada-language films
1993 films
Films scored by Hamsalekha
Kannada remakes of Tamil films
Films directed by D. Rajendra Babu